A tuba is a musical instrument that plays notes in the bass clef. 

Tuba can also refer to:

Instruments
Roman tuba, a straight trumpet of ancient Rome
Tuba curva, a revival of the Roman cornu
Wagner tuba, an instrument like the tuba curva (cornu)

Places
Tuba (river), a tributary of the Yenisey in Siberia, Russia
Tuba, Benguet, a municipality in the Philippines
Tuba, Iran, a village in Qazvin Province, Iran
A Palestinian village east of At-Tuwani, in the South Hebron Hills
An ancient Middle Eastern city, the contemporary Umm el-Marra
Tuba City, Arizona, a city in the United States named after Chief Tuba
Tubas (city), a Palestinian city in the northern West Bank

TUBA
 Trans-umbilical breast augmentation, a plastic surgical procedure
 Türkiye Bilimler Akademisi (TÜBA), the Turkish Academy of Sciences
 TCP and UDP with Bigger Addresses, a proposed replacement for Internet Protocol v4

Other uses
Tubâ, Filipino palm wine, also found in Mexico, Guam, the Marianas, and Australia
Tuba (given name), also spelt Tuğba
Ṭūbā (tree), a tree that Muslims believe grows in heaven
Tuba Dei, the largest medieval bell in Poland, in the tower of the Cathedral in Toruń
Tuba mirum, a mass liturgy
Tuba Records, a Scandinavian music distributor and owner of Tabu Recordings
Chief Tuba (c. 1810–1887), leader of the Hopi nation
Cumulonimbus tuba, a column of cloud that may develop into a funnel cloud
An alternate name for the Bidayat, an ethnic group in the Sudan and Chad
The singular name that the Tubular people apply to themselves
The Indonesian word for the plant Derris elliptica

See also
 
Touba (disambiguation)
Tubatuba, the Filipino word for Jatropha curcas